The 2003 MasterCard Truck Series was the second and final season of MasterCard Truck Series. César Tiberio Jiménez was proclaimed champion. This series was replaced by Desafío Corona the next year.

Results

 Estadio Azteca was racing venue for only time. A 500 meters oval was mounted in the parking lot.

Standings

References

MasterCard Truck Series
MasterCard Truck Series season